The A.B. Brewer Building is a historic commercial building on Arkansas Highway 66 in the central business district of Mountain View, Arkansas.  It is a single-story structure, built out of load-bearing stone masonry, sharing party walls with adjacent buildings opposite the Stone County Courthouse, and houses three storefronts topped by a tall stone entablature.  It was built in 1929 by the Brewer Brothers, who were local stonemasons.

The building was listed on the National Register of Historic Places in 1985.

See also
National Register of Historic Places listings in Stone County, Arkansas

References

Commercial buildings on the National Register of Historic Places in Arkansas
Buildings and structures in Mountain View, Arkansas
National Register of Historic Places in Stone County, Arkansas
Commercial buildings completed in 1929